Emanuel Khoshaba Youkhana (Arabic: عمانوئيل خوشابا يوخنا) is the current president of the Assyrian Patriotic Party, based in Iraq. He became part of the party's council in 2002, and subsequently became vice-president in 2006.

He graduated from Baghdad Institute of Technology in 1984. While a student, he was active with mobilizing the Assyrian youth in the capital, and joined the Assyrian Patriotic Party in the mid-1980s.

He will be running for the Iraqi parliament on 12 May 2018.

References

Iraqi Assyrian politicians
Living people
1963 births